Glenroy Samuel (born April 5, 1990 in San Juan) is a Trinidad and Tobago footballer who plays as a goalkeeper for Morvant Caledonia United and the Trinidad and Tobago national team.

Honours
Morvant Caledonia United
FA Trophy: 2012–13

North East Stars
FA Trophy: 2014–15

References

Living people
1990 births
Trinidad and Tobago footballers
Trinidad and Tobago international footballers
Trinidad and Tobago expatriate footballers
Association football goalkeepers
Morvant Caledonia United players
United Petrotrin F.C. players
Joe Public F.C. players
North East Stars F.C. players
Ma Pau Stars S.C. players
TT Pro League players
Expatriate footballers in Antigua and Barbuda
Trinidad and Tobago expatriate sportspeople in Antigua and Barbuda
People from San Juan–Laventille
2009 CONCACAF U-20 Championship players